Bonaventure was a staffed Via Rail station in the town of Bonaventure, Quebec, Canada. The station is closed permanently with no ticket agent; Via lists Bonaventure as a "sign post". , the Gaspé train is not running; the closest passenger rail service is provided at the Matapédia railway station.

References

External links

Via Rail stations in Quebec
Railway stations in Gaspésie–Îles-de-la-Madeleine
Disused railway stations in Canada